The Church of the Holy Trinity at Chantry, in the parish of Whatley, Somerset, England, dates from 1844 to 1846.  It was designed by George Gilbert Scott and William Moffatt, with further work by William George Brown of Frome, for James Fussell, who owned the Old Iron Works, Mells. It is a Grade I listed building.

The small Doulting stone church has a nave, chancel, porch and vestry. The small spire contains a single bell.

In 1858 Richard William Church was amongst the clergy of the church.

Nearby is the Manor Farmhouse Gatehouse which was built around 1500 and is also Grade I listed.

The parish is within the benefice of Mells with Buckland Dinham, Great Elm and Whatley within the Frome deanery.

See also

 Grade I listed buildings in Mendip
 List of Somerset towers
 List of ecclesiastical parishes in the Diocese of Bath and Wells

References

Churches completed in 1844
Chantry
Chantry
Chantry
Chantry